Maria Magdalene is a circa 1530 oil on panel painting by the Dutch renaissance artist Jan van Scorel in the collection of the Rijksmuseum.

Painting
Mary Magdalene is shown seated, holding a richly decorated pot of ointment in a fantasy landscape. Her bodice is embroidered with Hebrew lettering and her shawl shows the same pattern of Haarlem damast material that can be seen in Saint Luke painting the Virgin by Maarten van Heemskerck.

Provenance
This painting was in the collection of the Commanderij van Sint Jan in Haarlem and was appropriated in 1572 (as a work by Van Scorel) after the Beeldenstorm for the Haarlem City Hall. It was again appropriated by the national collection in 1804 (as an anonymous  work) and has remained in the national collection on show in Amsterdam ever since, though it was on loan to the Frans Hals Museum for many years during the renovation of the Rijksmuseum.

Exhibitions

This painting has been considered a highlight of the collection since it was acquired in 1804 and has been included in all Highlights of the Rijksmuseum catalogs.

References

 SK-A-372 painting record on museum website

1530s paintings
Paintings in the collection of the Rijksmuseum
Paintings depicting Mary Magdalene